Michelle Elizabeth Mitchell  is the Chief Executive of Cancer Research UK. She has worked extensively in the charity sector, having led Age UK, the Multiple Sclerosis Society of Great Britain and the Fawcett Society. She is a non-executive director of NHS England.

Education and early career 
Mitchell grew up in Ellesmere Port. She was the first in her family to attend university, and studied economics at the University of Manchester, earning a bachelor's degree in 1994. She worked for Donald Dewar after graduating, completing a Master's degree at University College London in political administration in the evenings. In 1997 she joined Charter 88, a political campaigning group who worked on the House of Lords Reform Bill 2012. She earned an International Executive Diploma from INSEAD in 2005 and an Innovations in Governance qualification from the John F. Kennedy School of Government in 2006.

Career 
Mitchell was appointed the governmental affairs adviser to the National Society for the Prevention of Cruelty to Children (NSPCC) in 2000. Mitchell worked at Age Concern as Head of Public Affairs from 2002 and Director of Communications from 2007. From 2005 to 2008 Mitchell was Chair of Trustees of the Fawcett Society.

She worked as Charity Director at Age UK from 2010. At Age UK Mitchell launched Let's Talk Money to get the charity to tackle several political issues, aiming to improve old people's incomes. She spoke about her work on Woman's Hour. When she left she appointed Hannah Pearce and Angela Kitching to job share as Head of External Relations.

Mitchell served as Chief Executive of the Multiple Sclerosis Society of Great Britain from 2013 to 2018. She oversaw a 40% increase in access to treatments for MS and launched a £100 million fundraising campaign. During this time she wrote regularly for the Huffington Post. She is a non-executive director of NHS England and on board of trustees of Power to Change Trust. As non-executive chief director she visits NHS facilities and evaluates their progress. She was appointed the Chief Executive of Cancer Research UK in 2018.

Awards and honours
Mitchell was appointed Order of the British Empire (OBE) in the 2016 New Year Honours for services to Older People and the Voluntary Sector. She was named by Cranfield University as one of the 100 Women to Watch in 2018.

References 

1972 births
Living people
Women chief executives
Alumni of the University of Manchester
Alumni of University College London